Van Daele is a Dutch toponymic surname. It is most common in the Belgian province of East Flanders. The agglutinated form Vandaele is most common in West Flanders. Notable people with the surname include:

Van Daele
 (1944–2017), Belgian Chief of Defence 2002–2009
Edmond Van Daële (1884–1960), pseudonym of the French actor Edmond Minckwitz
Frans van Daele (born 1947), Belgian dignitary
Jo Van Daele (born 1972), Belgian discus thrower
Joop van Daele (born 1947), Dutch footballer
Joseph Van Daele (1889–1948), Belgian racing cyclist
Kaat Van Daele (born 1989), Belgian figure skater
Shawn Van Daele, Canadian photographer
Vandaele
Leon Vandaele (1933–2000), Belgian racing cyclist
Wilfried Vandaele (born 1959), Belgian New Flemish Alliance politician

See also
Van Dalen, Dutch surname

References

Dutch-language surnames
Surnames of Belgian origin
Toponymic surnames